The Beecraft Honey Bee was an all-metal V-tailed homebuilt aircraft, that was designed by Walter E. Mooney and first flown on 12 July 1952.

Design and development
The Honey Bee was designed and built by Walter E. Mooney

The Honey Bee is a single seat all metal, high-wing, tricycle gear-equipped aircraft with a V-tail. The stressed skin aircraft is designed to accommodate wing flaps and slots.

The prototype was test flown by William Chana on 12 July 1952 and certified on 17 December 1953.

Aircraft on display

The Honey Bee prototype now is on display at the San Diego Air & Space Museum. It is the lone Bee aircraft to survive an arson fire at the museum.

Specifications (Honey Bee)

References

External links

Homebuilt aircraft
High-wing aircraft
Single-engined tractor aircraft
V-tail aircraft
Aircraft first flown in 1952
1950s United States civil utility aircraft
Honey Bee